The 2000 Nokia Cup, southern Ontario men's provincial curling championship was held February 7-13 at the Steve Yzerman Arena at the Nepean Sportsplex in Nepean, Ontario. The winning rink of Peter Corner, Todd Brandwood, Drew Macklin and Dwayne Pyper from Hamilton would go on to represent Ontario at the 2000 Labatt Brier in Saskatoon.

In the final, Peter Corner and his Hamilton rink defeated his cousin and former teammate, Wayne Middaugh's Toronto rink, 6–4. The game began on a bad note for Middaugh who was heavy on his draw attempt in the first end, giving up a steal of one to Corner. Middaugh gave up another steal in the eighth end after coming up light on a draw, to go down 5–3. The teams traded singles in the next two ends for a 6 to 4 final score.

Corner's new rink of Todd Brandwood, Drew Macklin and Dwayne Pyper had played in just eight games before playdowns that season. It marked Corner's fifth trip to the Brier, but the first as a skip. The four previous times had been playing lead for Team Russ Howard which also included Middaugh at second.

Teams

Standings

Round-robin results

Draw 1
February 7

Draw 2
February 8

Draw 3
February 8

Draw 4
February 9

Draw 5
February 9

Draw 6
February 10

Draw 7
February 10

Draw 8
February 11

Draw 9
February 11

Playoffs

Semifinal
February 12, 3:00pm

Final
February 13, 1:00pm

Qualification

Zone Winners
Regional winners in bold.

Challenge Round
Bryan Cochrane won the East Challenge Round and Kevin Breivik won the West Challenge Round.

Sources
Ontario Curling Association 1999-00 Annual Report
- Coverage on curlingzone.com

References

Ontario
Ontario Tankard
Curling in Ottawa
2000 in Ontario
February 2000 sports events in Canada
2000s in Ottawa